Virgil-Daniel Popescu is a Romanian politician who has been serving as Minister of Energy in the Ciucă Cabinet, led by Prime Minister Nicolae Ciucă, . He previously served in the first and second cabinets led by Ludovic Orban, as well as in the cabinet led by Florin Cîțu.

References 

Living people
Year of birth missing (living people)
Place of birth missing (living people)
21st-century Romanian politicians
Members of the Romanian Cabinet
National Liberal Party (Romania) politicians